Larry Griffin (September 23, 1954 – June 21, 1995) was sentenced to death for the murder of 19-year-old Quintin Moss in St. Louis, Missouri on the afternoon of June 26, 1980.

Moss was killed in a drive-by shooting while allegedly dealing drugs on a street corner.

Death
Appeals courts upheld his conviction and death sentence. Griffin was executed by lethal injection on June 21, 1995. Griffin maintained his innocence right up to his execution.

Re-opened investigation
After Griffin's execution, a 2005 post-execution investigation was sponsored by the NAACP Legal Defense and Educational Fund. This NAACP investigation raised doubts about the conviction (specifically as to the shooter's identity), and subsequently caused an investigation by the St. Louis City Circuit Attorney's Office.  The St. Louis City investigation ended in a finding that "the right person was convicted".

See also
 Capital punishment in Missouri
 Capital punishment in the United States
 List of people executed in Missouri

External links
 Article on the Web
 Editorial from NY Times
 Article from NY Times
 Equal Justice
 Did Missouri execute an innocent man?. MSNBC (2005-07-12). Retrieved on 2007-11-20.
 Missouri death sentence case gets another look. MSNBC (2005-08-05). Retrieved on 2007-11-20.

1954 births
1995 deaths
American people convicted of murder
People executed for murder
20th-century executions by Missouri
People from St. Louis
People executed by Missouri by lethal injection
People convicted of murder by Missouri
Executed African-American people
20th-century executions of American people
20th-century African-American people